The North Eastern Railway (NER) Class E, classified as Class J71 by the London and North Eastern Railway (LNER), was a class of small 0-6-0T steam locomotive designed by T.W. Worsdell. They had inside cylinders and Stephenson valve gear and were the basis for the later NER Class E1 (LNER Class J72).

Numbering
Eighty-one of them passed into British Railways ownership in 1948 and they were numbered 68230-68316 (with gaps).

Accidents and incidents
In 1890, locomotive No. 811 was hauling a freight train when it was derailed on the Redheugh Incline, Gateshead, County Durham.

References

External links 

 The T.W. Worsdell J71 (NER Class E) 0-6-0 Tank Engines LNER Encyclopedia

0-6-0T locomotives
E
Railway locomotives introduced in 1886
Scrapped locomotives
Standard gauge steam locomotives of Great Britain